Darinka Jevrić (Serbian Cyrillic: Даринка Јеврић; 21 October 1947 – 16 February 2007) was a Kosovo Serb poet.

Background 
Jevrić was born in Glođane (Gllogjan) near Peć. She worked for 25 years as a cultural journalist and critic at the Pristina-based Jedinstvo newspaper.

Her first poems were included in an anthology in 1970. They were followed in her lifetime by eight books published between 1973 and 2006. Her most famous poem is "Dečanska Zvona" ("The Deçani Bells").

At the end of the Kosovo War in June 1999, Jevrić was one of the few Serb intellectuals who chose to stay in Kosovo. She lived in Pristina until the March 2004 anti-Serb riots. She died in Belgrade, aged 59.

References

1947 births
2007 deaths
Writers from Peja
Kosovo Serbs
Yugoslav poets